Baristas is a 2019 documentary directed by Rock Baijnauth and produced by Filmic Entertainment. It is executive produced by Phil Cha and was the last film to be distributed by The Orchard before the company rebranded to 1091 Media.

Baristas is the follow up to the documentary Barista which was distributed by Samuel Goldwyn Films. The film reached #1 on the iTunes Charts in multiple countries. The documentary follows four passionate national barista champions from different parts of the globe who struggle to prove themselves as they represent their country and their craft, in an effort to win the World Barista Championship in Seoul, South Korea.

Baristas was filmed in five countries: Japan, Ireland, South Korea, Germany, and the United States and was produced by Rock Baijnauth, Roger Singh, Ramona Serletic, Jawad Mir, Ritu Su, and George Nikitaras.

The film released in the United Kingdom on 2 April 2019.

References

External links 

2019 films
2019 documentary films
British documentary films
The Orchard (company) films
2010s English-language films
2010s British films